Bomber is a 1982 comedy film directed by Michele Lupo, featuring Bud Spencer and Kallie Knoetze.

Plot
Bud Graziano, the title's "Bomber" character, is a former heavyweight boxing champion who retired to private life on a ship. Jerry Calà is instead a Lombard punter who finds himself always in trouble and one day gets into really big trouble. In fact, he unwittingly sets himself against a group of thugs who answer only to the orders of a new boxing champion who is making the rounds in the area with his victories. So Bomber, suddenly feels his passion for boxing reawakened, so he opens a gym for amateurs and begins to train the promising young George. Bomber organizes meetings in which fellow boxer Rosco also participates. Rosco, being too strong, knocks ouy the young George. After many other battles, Bomber is on the verge of losing everything he has slowly and painstakingly put together and so he decides to himself confront Rosco in a boxing contest.

Cast
Bud Spencer as Bud Graziano aka Bomber
Jerry Calà as Jerry
 Stefano Mingardo as Giorgio Desideri aka Giorgione
Kallie Knoetze as Rosco Dunn
Gegia as Susanna
Nando Paone as Ossario
Valeria Cavalli as Giorgione's girlfriend
Bobby Rhodes as Samuel Newman
Rik Battaglia
Nello Pazzafini
Angela Campanella

See also       
 List of Italian films of 1982

External links

1982 films
1980s Italian-language films
Italian boxing films
Films scored by Guido & Maurizio De Angelis
Italian sports comedy films
1980s sports comedy films
1982 comedy films
Films directed by Michele Lupo
1980s Italian films